Elo Sambo (1885-1933) was a Cameroonian who served in the Imperial German Army in World War I, notable for being one of very few Africans to do so. He served as the kettle drummer in the Life Guard Hussars of Potsdam (1907–18) and later the 4th Cavalry Regiment of the Reichswehr, also at Potsdam. He was awarded the Iron Cross, first and second class.

See also
German Army order of battle (1914)

References
Interesting facts about the German Colonies
Race in the German Army in Africa - Gwynn Compton

1885 births
1933 deaths
German people of Cameroonian descent
Recipients of the Iron Cross (1914), 1st class
People of former German colonies